The Alamo: Shrine of Texas Liberty is a 1938 American black-and-white Western war film directed by Stuart Paton and produced by H. W. Kier and Norman Sheldon. The film was a two-reel short produced in a couple of weeks San Antonio, Texas. The film was done in pantomime and audio was done by narration and organ music.

The film starred Coates Gwynne, Sterling Waters and Mrs. Florence Griffith. The film is an educational reenactment of the siege at the Alamo, but the filming location was actually Mission San José.  The film was released soon after the centennial of the Alamo.

See also
 The Immortal Alamo (1911) earliest film on the Alamo
 Heroes of the Alamo (1937 film)
 The Alamo (1960) feature film starring John Wayne
 Alamo (disambiguation)#Films, for other films about the Alamo

References

External links
 

1938 films
1938 Western (genre) films
1930s war films
American Western (genre) films
American black-and-white films
Films directed by Stuart Paton
Siege films
Texas Revolution films
1930s American films